Travis Jason Prentice (born October 27, 1976) is a former American football running back who played collegiately at Miami of Ohio. Prentice held the NCAA Division I-A record for career rushing touchdowns until it was broken by Wisconsin's Montee Ball in 2012, and again by Keenan Reynolds of Navy in 2015.

High school career
Prentice attended duPont Manual High School in Louisville, Kentucky, where he was first team All-District and second team All-State his senior year while running for 1,510 yards and 17 touchdowns.

College career
Prentice was redshirted his freshman year.  The next year, Prentice had a very productive season even though he never broke into the starting line-up. In his first game, he ran for 102 yards and two touchdowns; for the season he ran for 601 yards on 123 carries and 12 touchdowns.

In his sophomore year, Prentice earned a spot in Randy Walker's starting line-up and rushed for 1549 yards and 25 touchdowns.  He was named first team All-Mid-American Conference and was one of eight semifinalists for the Doak Walker Award.

In Prentice's junior year he ran for 1787 yards and 19 touchdowns while leading the RedHawks to a 10–1 season.  Once again he was one of eight semifinalists for the Doak Walker Award.  He was edged by Marshall's Chad Pennington in the MAC's Vern Smith Award for player of the year.

His senior year was under a new head coach, Terry Hoeppner, who installed a more open passing attack rather than relying on the running game.  Prentice ran for 1659 yards and 17 touchdowns. In the process he broke several Division I-A scoring records and was named third team All-American by the Associated Press.

Prentice ended his career at Miami with 5,596 yards on 1,138 carries and numerous school, conference and NCAA records.  At one point he recorded 862 consecutive touches without a fumble.

On September 6, 2014, during halftime of the Eastern Kentucky game, Prentice became the fourth Miami RedHawk to have his football jersey retired. The previous three players were Ben Roethlisberger (#7), Bob Hitchens (#40), and John Pont (#42).

Notable games
vs. Akron (1999)
Prentice exploded for 376 rushing yards in a 32–23 win against Akron.  This set the Mid-American Conference record for most yards in a single game.  At the time it was the 6th highest rushing total in Division I-A history.  On his final carry of the game he broke Ricky Williams' career records both for points scored and total touchdowns with a 72-yard touchdown run.

At North Carolina (1998)
Prentice helped lead the RedHawks to a 13–10 upset of the #12 ranked North Carolina Tar Heels, rushing for 162 yards and a touchdown.  Most of his yards came in the second half, including several carries on the last drive that led to a last-second game-winning field goal by John Scott.  It was the first time in ten years that one player rushed for more than 150 yards on UNC.

At Virginia Tech (1997)
Prentice helped Miami to a 24–17 win over then-undefeated and twelfth-ranked Virginia Tech.  His numbers were not great (82 yards on 21 carries), but he ran for a touchdown on a game-changing fake field goal that was named CNN's "play of the day."

NCAA records (at the end of his career)
 Career rushing TDs (73)
 Career total TDs (78)
 Career points (468)
 Career points (non-kickers) (468)
 Games with TDs (35)
 Game with two or more TDs (25)
 Consecutive carries without a fumble, season (365)
 Consecutive carries without a fumble, career (862)

Professional career
Prentice was the first pick in the third round by the Cleveland Browns in the 2000 NFL Draft. As a rookie, he rushed for 512 yards and seven touchdowns, while also catching 37 passes, but was largely considered a bust due to his lowly 3.0 yards per carry average.  He was cut by Cleveland after the 2000 season, and had just 14 carries with the Minnesota Vikings the following year.  He then signed with the Arizona Cardinals, but did not play a single down with them and left the NFL after that.

See also
 List of Division I FBS rushing touchdown leaders

References

 Miami 2005 media guide

1976 births
Living people
Players of American football from Louisville, Kentucky
American football running backs
Miami RedHawks football players
Cleveland Browns players
Minnesota Vikings players
Arizona Cardinals players
DuPont Manual High School alumni